Gemonio is a comune (municipality) in the Province of Varese in the Lombardy region of Italy, located about  northwest of Milan and about  northwest of Varese.

Gemonio borders the following municipalities: Azzio, Besozzo, Brenta, Caravate, Cittiglio, Cocquio-Trevisago.

In Gemonio lives Umberto Bossi, an Italian politician.

Demographic evolution

References

Cities and towns in Lombardy